Roger Reina is the current University of Pennsylvania wrestling coach (1986–2005).  He left coaching in 2005 after 19 seasons on the mat where he had a career record of 205-106-6, making him the most successful coach in the 101-year history of the program.  He is credited with coaching 63 NCAA Qualifiers, 31 EIWA Champions, 17 All-Americans, 4 consecutive EIWA titles, three NCAA finalists, an NCAA Champion and an Olympic Gold Medalist.  Roger himself graduated from UPenn in 1984 where he was a four year starter on the team.

Reina is now the Director of Business Development for Sports at TicketLeap, an online ticketing provider located in Philadelphia.

Accomplishments
Chairman of the Ivy League Wrestling Coaches Association
President of the EIWA Coaches Association
President of the National Wrestling Coaches Association (NWCA)
Four-time NWCA National Coach of the Year nominee (1996-00)
Three-time EIWA Coach of the Year.

External links
 Penn Wrestling
 Ticketleap.com

References

American wrestling coaches
Living people
Year of birth missing (living people)
Penn Quakers wrestling coaches
Penn Quakers wrestlers